= Southeastern Massachusetts Law Enforcement Council =

Regional police agency in the US

The Southeastern Massachusetts Law Enforcement Council, sometimes called "SEMLEC," is a regional mutual aid facilitator formed by thirty police agencies in southeastern Massachusetts. It pools resources to provide SWAT, mobile operations, search and rescue, dive teams, color guards, and other units throughout the area.

Agencies that belong to SEMLEC include:

- Acushnet Police Department
- Berkley Police Department
- Bridgewater Police Department
- Bridgewater State University Police Department
- Carver Police Department
- Dartmouth Police Department
- Dighton Police Department
- East Bridgewater Police Department
- Fairhaven Police Department
- Freetown Police Department
- Halifax Police Department
- Hanson Police Department
- Kingston Police Department
- Lakeville Police Department
- Mattapoisett Police Department
- Marion Police Department
- Middleborough Police Department
- New Bedford Police Department
- Pembroke Police Department
- Plympton Police Department
- Raynham Police Department
- Rehoboth Police Department
- Rochester Police Department
- Seekonk Police Department
- Somerset Police Department
- Swansea Police Department
- Taunton Police Department
- Wareham Police Department
- West Bridgewater Police Department
- Westport Police Department
- Whitman Police Department
